Rossiya Tournament 1990 was played in Novosibirsk under the period 26–31 January 1990, and was won by Sweden. Hungary played for the first time.

The tournament began with a group stage and then had a knock-out stage to decide the final winner, with the teams losing in the semi-finals playing a third place consolation game.

Results of group stage

Knock-out stage

Semifinals
 -  6-1
 -  3-4

Match for third place
 -  12-1

Final
 -  4-2

Sources
 
 Norges herrlandskamper i bandy
 Sverige-Sovjet i bandy
 Rossijaturneringen

1990 in Soviet sport
1990 in bandy
1990